The 2005–06 season was Recreativo de Huelva's 117th season in existence and the club's third consecutive season in the second division of Spanish football. In addition to the domestic league, Recreativo de Huelva participated in this season's edition of the Copa del Rey. The season covered the period from 1 July 2005 to 30 June 2006. The club won the league for the first time ever and thus promoted to the La Liga.

Players

Current squad

Transfers

In

Out

Pre-season and friendlies

Competitions

Overview

Segunda División

League table

Results summary

Results by round

Matches

Copa del Rey

Statistics

Goalscorers

References

Recreativo de Huelva seasons
Recreativo de Huelva